Leone Azzali (7 January 1880 - 1 January 1963) was an Italian politician.

Azzali was born in Biella. He represented the Italian Republican Party in the Constituent Assembly of Italy in 1948.

References

1880 births
1963 deaths
People from Biella
Italian Republican Party politicians
Members of the Constituent Assembly of Italy
Politicians of Piedmont